Ferdinand Leeke (7 April 1859 – 1923) was a German Painter, famous for his depictions of scenes from Wagnerian Operas. A native of Burg bei Magdeburg, Germany, he studied at the Munich Academy under Ludwig von Herterich (1843–1905) and Sándor Liezen-Mayer, a genre and historical painter, and with Alexander von Wagner (1838–1919), a Hungarian genre and landscape painter.

Around 1889, Siegfried Wagner, the son of the composer Richard Wagner, commissioned Leeke to paint a series of paintings showing scenes from ten operas by Wagner.

Wagner Pictures 

 Rienzi: Act IV, Scene II
 The Flying Dutchman: Act III, Finale
 Tannhauser: Act III, Scene I.
 Lohengrin: Act III, Finale
 The Rheingold: Scene II
 The Valkyrie: Act I.
 Siegfried: Act II
 Götterdämmerung: Act III
 Tristan and Isolde: Act II
 The Mastersingers of Nuremberg: Act III

Gallery

References

External links

Scenes from Wagnerian Operas

1859 births
1923 deaths
People from Burg bei Magdeburg
19th-century German painters
19th-century male artists
German male painters
20th-century German painters
20th-century male artists
Lohengrin